An axis (plural axes) is an imaginary line around which an object rotates or is symmetrical. Axis may also refer to:

Mathematics
 Axis of rotation: see rotation around a fixed axis
Axis (mathematics), a designator for a Cartesian-coordinate dimension
 Axis, a line generated by basis vector in a linear algebra

Politics
Axis powers of World War II, 1936–1945.
Axis of evil (first used in 2002), U.S. President George W. Bush's description of Iran, Iraq, and North Korea
Axis of Resistance (first used in 2002), the Shia alliance of Iran, Syria, and Hezbollah 
Political spectrum, sometimes called an axis

Science
Axis of rotation: see rotation around a fixed axis
Axis (anatomy), the second cervical vertebra of the spine
Axis (genus), a genus of deer
Axis, an anatomical term of orientation
Axis, a botanical term meaning the line through the centre of a plant
Optical axis, a line of rotational symmetry
Axis (journal), online journal published by The Mineralogical Record

Technology
Apache Axis, a web-service framework from Apache Software Foundation
Yahoo! Axis, a mobile web browser

Arts and entertainment

Music
Axis: Bold as Love (1967), a studio album by The Jimi Hendrix Experience
Axis (Paul Bley album) (1977)
Axis (Pegz album) (2005)
"Axis" (song), 2013, by Pet Shop Boys

Other uses in arts and entertainment
AXIS (comics), "Avengers & X-Men: AXIS" (2014), a Marvel Comics storyline
Axis Amerika, the name of two teams of super-villains who have appeared in DC Comics
Axis, an asteroid in the Gundam science fiction media franchise
Axis (film), a 2017 drama directed by Aisha Tyler
Axis (novel), a 2007 science-fiction novel by Robert Charles Wilson
AXIS Dance Company, a professional contemporary dance company and dance education organization in Oakland, California, U.S.

Brands and enterprises 
Axis Bank, a private sector bank in India
AXIS Capital, a Bermuda-based and global operating reinsurer
Axis Communications, a Swedish manufacturer of IP cameras
AXIS Flight Training Systems, an Austrian-based manufacturer of flight simulators
Axis Percussion, a drum-related manufacturer 
Axis Records (disambiguation), several music labels
Axis Telecom, a national GSM mobile operator in Indonesia
The AXIS, a Las Vegas resort/casino concert venue

Other uses
Axis, Alabama, an unincorporated area in the United States

See also
Axis system of harmonic analysis
Axes (disambiguation)
Axial (disambiguation)
Axios (disambiguation)
Axis 2 (disambiguation)
Axius (disambiguation)